Line 4 of the Saint Petersburg Metro, also known as Lakhtinsko-Pravoberezhnaya Line or Orange Line, is a rapid transit line in Saint Petersburg, Russia, which connects city centre with the south-east districts on the right bank of the Neva River. Despite its name, which literally means Lakhta–Right Bank Line, the line from its opening date had the stations on the left bank of the Neva River. Moreover, currently the line has not any stations near the Lakhta area. Opened in 1985, it is the shortest line in the system with the stations featuring a modern design. Since 1994, it has been officially designated "Line 4," but the original name is still often used in informal context.

The line originally opened to provide access from the centre for the new residential areas in the eastern part of city, along the right bank of the Neva. However, delays in the construction of the future Line 5, compelled the metro officials to temporarily link the already completed northern part of the Line 5 (starting from Sadovaya) to Line 4, as they felt that it was better to have a single connected line rather than two unconnected ones. From that point on, the line expanded northward, as per original plans of Line 5 expansion.

On March 7, 2009, Spasskaya station was completed, creating the city's first three-way transfer and it officially became the new terminal for Line 4. As per the original plan, all Line 4 stations north of Dostoyevskaya were absorbed into the recently opened Line 5.

Timeline

* Segment from Sadovaya to Komendantsky Prospekt has been transferred to Line 5. Spasskaya has become the interchange station to Line 5 at Sadovaya.

Name changes

Transfers

Rolling stock
The line is served by the Vyborgskoe (No. 6) depot, and has 42 six-carriage trains assigned to it. Some of them are 81-717/714 trains from the 1980s, while others are the 81-540.2/541.2, .5, and .8 modifications from the 2000s.

Recent developments and future plans
Over the coming years, there will be an expansion into the west to Kamenka. In the east there are plans to expand one station further, to Narodnaya, after which there will be a new depot called the Pravoberezhnoye depot.

A maglev has been proposed.

Planned stations
Beyond Ulitsa Dybenko:
 Kudrovo
 Yugo-Vostochnaya

References

Saint Petersburg Metro lines
Railway lines opened in 1985